Martyn Sigley (born 16 November 1972) is a New Zealand cricketer. He played in 44 first-class and 4 List A matches for Central Districts from 1994 to 2003.

See also
 List of Central Districts representative cricketers

References

External links
 

1972 births
Living people
New Zealand cricketers
Central Districts cricketers
Cricketers from Hamilton, New Zealand